Botula is a genus of mussels in the family Mytilidae.

Selected species
 Botula fusca (Gmelin, 1791) — cinnamon mussel

References

Mytilidae
Bivalve genera